The arrondissement of Céret is an arrondissement of France in the Pyrénées-Orientales department (Northern Catalonia) in the Occitanie region. It has 64 communes.

Composition

The communes of the arrondissement of Céret, and their INSEE codes, are:

 L'Albère (66001)
 Alénya (66002)
 Amélie-les-Bains-Palalda (66003)
 Argelès-sur-Mer (66008)
 Arles-sur-Tech (66009)
 Bages (66011)
 Banyuls-dels-Aspres (66015)
 Banyuls-sur-Mer (66016)
 La Bastide (66018)
 Le Boulou (66024)
 Brouilla (66026)
 Caixas (66029)
 Calmeilles (66032)
 Camélas (66033)
 Castelnou (66044)
 Cerbère (66048)
 Céret (66049)
 Les Cluses (66063)
 Collioure (66053)
 Corneilla-del-Vercol (66059)
 Corsavy (66060)
 Coustouges (66061)
 Elne (66065)
 Fourques (66084)
 Lamanère (66091)
 Laroque-des-Albères (66093)
 Latour-Bas-Elne (66094)
 Llauro (66099)
 Maureillas-las-Illas (66106)
 Montauriol (66112)
 Montbolo (66113)
 Montescot (66114)
 Montesquieu-des-Albères (66115)
 Montferrer (66116)
 Oms (66126)
 Ortaffa (66129)
 Palau-del-Vidre (66133)
 Passa (66134)
 Le Perthus (66137)
 Port-Vendres (66148)
 Prats-de-Mollo-la-Preste (66150)
 Reynès (66160)
 Saint-André (66168)
 Saint-Cyprien (66171)
 Sainte-Colombe-de-la-Commanderie (66170)
 Saint-Génis-des-Fontaines (66175)
 Saint-Jean-Lasseille (66177)
 Saint-Jean-Pla-de-Corts (66178)
 Saint-Laurent-de-Cerdans (66179)
 Saint-Marsal (66183)
 Serralongue (66194)
 Sorède (66196)
 Taillet (66199)
 Taulis (66203)
 Le Tech (66206)
 Terrats (66207)
 Théza (66208)
 Thuir (66210)
 Tordères (66211)
 Tresserre (66214)
 Trouillas (66217)
 Villelongue-dels-Monts (66225)
 Villemolaque (66226)
 Vivès (66233)

History

The arrondissement of Céret was created in 1800. In January 2017 it gained 24 communes from the arrondissement of Perpignan.

As a result of the reorganisation of the cantons of France which came into effect in 2015, the borders of the cantons are no longer related to the borders of the arrondissements. The cantons of the arrondissement of Céret were, as of January 2015:
 Argelès-sur-Mer
 Arles-sur-Tech
 Céret
 Côte Vermeille
 Prats-de-Mollo-la-Preste

References

Céret
Ceret
Northern Catalonia